A machicolation is a floor opening between the supporting corbels of a battlement, through which stones or other material, such as boiling water, hot sand, quicklime or boiling cooking oil, could be dropped on attackers at the base of a defensive wall. A smaller version found on smaller structures is called a box-machicolation.

Terminology

The structures are thought to have originated as Crusader imitations of mashrabiya.

The word derives from the Old French word machecol, mentioned in Medieval Latin as machecollum, probably from Old French machier 'crush', 'wound' and col 'neck'. Machicolate is only recorded in the 18th century in English, but a verb machicollāre is attested in Anglo-Latin. 

Both the Spanish and Portuguese words denoting this structure (matacán and mata-cães, respectively), are similarly composed from "matar canes" meaning roughly "killing dogs", the latter word being a slur referring to infidels.

In Italy and countries which were influenced by the Italian language, such as Malta, it was known as piombatoio.

Similar to a machicolation is a smaller version which opens similar to an enclosed balcony, generally from a tower rather than a larger structure. This is called a box-machicolation.

Description and use 

The design of a machicoulis (sometimes called drop box) originates from the Middle East, where they are usually found on defensive walls. The original Arabian design is rather small, and similar to the domestic wooden balcony known as mashrabiya.

In contrast to the domestic balcony, for purposes of defense, the Middle-East version of the machicoulis prominently features a wide opening at the bottom. The opening allows the dropping of hot water and other material intended to cause harm to the enemy below. The otherwise enclosed opening adapted from that of a closed balcony also provides cover from enemy attack while using it.

Machicolations were more common in French castles than English, where they were usually restricted to the gateway, as in the 13th-century Conwy Castle. One of the first examples of machicolation that still exists in northern France is at the Château de Farcheville built in 1291 outside Paris.

The origins are from Syria and the Crusaders brought their design to Europe. Machicolations were a common feature in many towers in Rhodes, which were built by the Knights Hospitallers. After the Knights were given rule over Malta, machicolations also became a common feature on rural buildings, until the 18th century. Buildings with machicolations include Cavalier Tower, Gauci Tower, the Captain's Tower, Birkirkara Tower, and Tal-Wejter Tower.

A hoarding is a similar structure made of wood, usually temporarily constructed in the event of a siege. Advantages of machicolations over wooden hoardings include the greater strength and fire resistance of stone.

Post-medieval use

Machicolation was later used for decorative effect with spaces between the corbels but without the openings, and subsequently became a characteristic of many non-military buildings.

See also
 
Arrow slit
Bartizan
Battlement
Bretèche
Defensive walls
Jettying
Murder hole
Hoarding (castle)

Notes

References

Bibliography

External links

Glossary of Medieval Art and Architecture: machicolation.
Machicolation

Castle architecture